The Malabar rebellion of 1921 (also called Moplah rebellion, and Mappila rebellion, Malayalam: malabār kalāpam) started as a resistance against the British colonial rule in Malabar region of Kerala. The popular uprising was also against the prevailing feudal system controlled by elite Hindus. The British had appointed high caste Hindus in positions of authority to get their support, this led to the protest turning against the Hindus.

For many, the rebellion was primarily a peasant revolt against the colonial government. During the uprising, the rebels attacked various symbols and institutions of the colonial state, such as telegraph lines, train stations, courts and post offices.

There were also a series of clashes between the Mappila peasantry and their landlords, the latter supported by the British colonial government, throughout the 19th and early 20th centuries. The heavy-handed suppression of the Khilafat Movement by the colonial government was met by resistance in the Eranad and Valluvanad taluks of Malabar. The Mappilas attacked and took control of police stations, colonial government offices, courts and government treasuries.

For six months from August 1921, the rebellion extended over  – some 40% of the South Malabar region of the Madras Presidency. The British colonial government sent troops to quell the rebellion and martial law imposed. An estimated 10,000 people died, although official figures put the numbers at 2337 rebels killed, 1652 injured and 45,404 imprisoned. Unofficial estimates put the number imprisoned at almost 50,000 of whom 20,000 were deported, mainly to the penal colony in the Andaman Islands, while around 10,000 went missing.  According to Arya Samaj, about 600 Hindus were killed and 2,500 were forcibly converted to Islam during the rebellion.

Contemporary colonial administrators and modern historians differ markedly in their assessment of the incident, debating whether the revolts were triggered by religious fanaticism or agrarian grievances. At the time, the Indian National Congress repudiated the movement and it remained isolated from the wider nationalist movement. However, some contemporary Indian evaluations now view the rebellion as a national upheaval against colonial rule and the most important event concerning the political movement in Malabar during the period.

In its magnitude and extent, it was an unprecedented popular upheaval, the likes of which has not been seen in Kerala before or since. While the Mappilas were in the vanguard of the movement and bore the brunt of the struggle, several non-Mappila leaders actively sympathised with the rebels' cause, giving the uprising the character of a national upheaval. In 1971, the Government of Kerala officially recognised the active participants in the events as "freedom fighters".

Background

Land ownership in Malabar

Malabar's agricultural system was historically based on a hierarchy of privileges, rights and obligations for all principal social groups in what British administrator William Logan sometimes referred to as the "Father of Tenancy Legislation" in Malabar, describing it as a system of 'corporate unity’ or joint proprietorship of each of the principal land right holders:

Jenmi
The Jenmi, consisting mainly of the Namboothiri Brahmins and Nair chieftains, were the highest level of the hierarchy, and a class of people given hereditary land grants by the Naduvazhis or rulers'. The rights conveyed by this janmam were not a freehold in the European sense, but an office of dignity. Owing to their ritual status as priests (Nambudris), the jenmis could neither cultivate nor supervise the land but would instead provide a grant of kanam to a kanakkaran in return for a fixed share of the crops produced. Typically, a Jenmi would have a large number of kanakkarar under him.

Verumpattakkaran
The Verumpattakkarar, generally Thiyya and Mappila classes, cultivated the land but were also its part-proprietors under the kanakkarar. These classes were given a Verum Pattam (Simple Lease) of the land that was typically valid for one year. According to custom, they were also entitled to one-third or an equal share of the net produce.

The net produce of the land was the share left over after providing for the cherujanmakkar or all the other birthright holders such as the village carpenter, the goldsmith and agricultural labourers who helped to gather, prepare and store produce. The system ensured that no Jenmi could evict tenants under him except for non-payment of rent. This land tenure system was generally referred to as the janmi-kana-maryada (customary practices).

Land reforms and Mappila outbreaks

During the Mysorean invasion of Malabar, the Jenmi took refuge in neighbouring states. The tenants and the Nair army men who could not escape were converted into Islam, as described in William Logan's Malabar Manual. Thus, Tipu Sultan's Kingdom of Mysore, having driven the Jenmi out of Malabar, reached accord with the Muslim Kanakkars. A new system of land revenue was introduced for the first time in the region's history with the government share fixed on the basis of actual produce from the land.

However, within five years, the East India Company took over Malabar, defeating Tipu Sultan and ending his reign over the region. This allowed the Jenmi to return to their homes and regain the lands lost during the Mysorean invasion, with the help of the Company administration and its duly-constituted courts. The Company introduced several Western juridical concepts, such as that of absolute property rights, into the existing legal system of Malabar. Up until then, such rights had been unknown in the region and as a result all land became the private property of the Jenmi. This legal recognition gave them the right to evict tenants, which was in turn enforced through the colonial civil courts. In the words of William Logan:

As conditions worsened, rents rose to as high as 75–80% of net produce, leaving the Verumpattakkar cultivators largely "only straw". This caused great resentment among the Mappilas, who, in the words of Logan, were "labouring late and early to provide a sufficiency of food for their wives and children". Resentment among the Muslim tentant population due to being vulnerable to rack renting, insecure tenancy,  and eviction at the hands of Hindu landlords (jenmi) sustained by British courts, the Mappillas responded in a series of outbreaks, in which they wanted their own death, 29 in number, between 1836 and 1919 were suppressed. These usually involved the violence against Nambudiri and Nair landlords. During the nineteenth century conversions to Islam heightened dramatically as lower caste Cheruman serfs embraced Islam so that they got liberation from the caste system and support from fellow Muslims to protest against jenmi tyranny. The colonial government referred to the outbreaks as "Moplah outrages", but modern historians tend to treat them as religious outbreaks or expressions of agrarian discontent. The outbreak of 1921–22 sustained this tradition of violence in Malabar with one crucial difference: this time it had also a political ideology and a formal organization.

Khilafat Movement 

Diwan Bahadur C. Gopalan Nair in his book, The Moplah Rebellion 1921, writes thus:

Nair noted Ali Musliyar rose to prominence at the instance of a Khilafat conference held in Karachi. Furthermore, Musliyar was not a native of Tirurangadi. He had only moved in 14 years earlier. So, according to Nair, there was not class revolt he was handling. It was a Khilafat edifice prepared and passed from distant Karachi, possibly controlled by spiritual leaders of Islam.

The Khilafat movement was introduced into the district of Malabar on 28 April 1920, by a Resolution at the Malabar District Conference, held at Manjeri, the headquarters of Ernad Taluk. On 30 March 1921, there was a meeting at which one Abdulla Kutti Musaliar of Vayakkad lectured on Khilafat, in Kizhakoth Amsom, Calicut Taluk. And at a second meeting held the next day at Pannur Mosque, there was some unpleasantness between the Mappilas on one side, and Nairs and Tiyyar, who resented the Khilafat meeting, on the other. The Mappilas mustered the strength to attack the place of worship belonging to the Hindu Adhigari of the village.

Nature of attacks 
The Malabar Rebellion witnessed many attacks on British officers in the region. The Madras High Court, which adjudicated in this matter, had passed judgements on each of the cases against the various Mappila rioters who were captured. The Madras High Court said on the matter,

The District Magistrate stated that reliable information had been received about 180 forced conversions of Hindus and the actual total may run into thousands. Roland E. Miller estimates forced conversions as in the range of 200 and 2500.
In the aftermath of this violence, the Suddhi Movement was created by the Arya Samaj. They converted over 2,000 Hindus who had been forcibly converted to Islam by the Mappilas.   Sumit Sarkar in Modern India quotes an Arya Samaj source that claimed about 600 Hindus were killed and 2,500 forcibly converted during the rebellion.  Variyankunnath Kunjahammad Haji claimed to have killed the alleged British agents and spies responsible for the forced conversion of Hindus to Mohammadanism and killing others. However, their leader, Swami Shraddhananda was stabbed on 23 December 1926 by an Islamist at his Ashram.

Punishments of rebel leaders 
The following were the various leaders of the movement, who were sentenced to death following the Malabar Rebellion:
 Ali Musliyar, leader of the rebellion
 Kunhi Kadir, Khilafat Secretary, Tanur
 Variankunnath Kunhammad Haji
 Kunhj Koya, Thangal, President of the Khilafat Committee, Malappuram
 Koya Tangal of Kumaramputhur, Governor of a Khilafat principality
 Chembrasseri Imbichi Koya Thangal, notorious for his alleged killing of 38 men by slashing their necks and throwing them into a well
 Palakamthodi Avvocker Musaliar
 Konnara Mohammed Koya Thangal

Rebellion and response

On 1 August 1921,
the police attempted to arrest Vadakkevittil Muhammed, the secretary of the Khilafat Committee of Ernad at Pookkottur, alleging that he had stolen the pistol of a Hindu Thirumulpad from a Kovilakam (manor) in Nilambur. A crowd of 2,000 Mappilas from the neighbourhood foiled the attempt. On 20 August 1921,
a squad of police arrested a number of Khilafat volunteers and seized records  at the Mambaram Mosque in Tirurangadi, leading to rumours that the building had been desecrated. A large crowd of Mappilas converged on Tirurangadi and besieged the local police station. The police opened fire on the crowd, triggering a furious reaction which soon engulfed the Eranad and Valluvanad Taluks along with neighbouring areas and continued for over two months.

Following the mosque incident, the rebels attacked and seized police stations, government treasuries, and entered the courts and registry offices where they destroyed records. Some even climbed into the judges' seats and proclaimed the advent of swaraj (self-rule). The rebellion soon spread to the neighbouring areas of Malappuram, Manjeri, Perinthalmanna, Pandikkad and Tirur under principle leaders Variankunnath Kunjahammad Haji, Seethi Koya Thangal of Kumaranpathor and Ali Musliyar. By 28 August 1921 colonial rule had virtually come to an end in Malappuram, Tirurangadi, Manjeri, and Perinthalmanna, which then fell into the hands of the rebels who established complete domination over the Eranad and Valluvanad Taluks. On 24 August 1921 Variankunnath Kunjahammad Haji took over command of the rebellion from Ali Musliyar. Public proclamations were issued by Variyankunnath and Seethi that those Mappilas who resorted to looting would receive exemplary punishments.

During the initial stages of the rebellion, the colonial military and police were forced to withdraw from these areas but by the end of August, several contingents of colonial troops and Gurkha arrived. Clashes with the rebels followed, one of the most notable encounters taking place at Pookkottur (often referred to as the Battle of Pookkottur) in which colonial troops sustained heavy casualties and had to retreat to safety.

During the early phase of the rebellion, the targets were primarily the Jenmi and the colonial government. Crimes committed by some of the rebels were accepted by leaders. After the proclamation of martial law and the arrival of government troops, when some members of the Hindu community were enlisted by the army to provide information on the rebels.
It is alleged that once they had eliminated the minimal presence of the government, the Mappilas turned their full attention to attacking Hindus while Ernad and Valluvanad were declared "Khilafat kingdoms". During the rebellion, a Mappila gang under the leadership of Odayappurath Chekkutty from Kalpakanchery protected the Kizhake Kovilakam (a seat of the ruling family of the Zamorin of Calicut) and the Arya Vaidya Sala at Kottakkal. Vaidyaratnam P. S. Warrier, who is also the founder of renowned Arya Vaidya Sala and Kottakkal Natya Sangham at Kottakkal, provided the entire shelter and protection for the orphaned Mappila families when the British started to arrest Mappila household men.

By the end of 1921, the situation was brought under control. The colonial government raised a special quasi-military (or Armed Police) battalion, the Malabar Special Police, initially consisting of non-Muslims and trained by the colonial army. The Special Police then engaged the rioters and eventually put an end to the riot.

Reactions and aftermath

Different people including Variyankunnath Kunjahammad Haji criticised the atrocities against Hindus in the name of the movement, of which Variyankunnath Kunjahammad Haji said were part of the British plot; in each one's different narrative as they tried to  understand it. Variyankunnath Kunjahammad Haji also claimed to have killed the British agents and spies responsible for this.

Message to Friends of Freedom for India 
On 7 December 1921 two American newspapers reported the message received by the Friends of Freedom for India from Variyankunnath Kunjahammad Haji  in a cablegram. In these two American newspaper reports the message was preceded by the following sentence: "Charges that the Moplahs of Malabar have put to death many Hindus and forcibly converted others to Mohammedanism were denied and characterized as part of a British plot to discredit the Moplah movement of India's independence in a cablegram from Variyankunnath Kunjahammad Haji..."
In the message he said :  "A few cases of conversion of our Hindu brethren have been reported to me." the message said. "But after proper investigation we discovered the real plot. The vandals that were guilty of this crime were members of the British reserve police and British intelligence department, and they joined our forces as patriots to do such filthy work only to discredit our soldiers. There are Christians, Hindus and Moplahs amongst these British agents and spies. They have decidedly been put to death.

"We are at war with England. We are fighting for the independence of India, and we are doing exactly what the Americans did to free America from British domination. So anyone giving aid and comfort to the enemy will be se verely dealt with, irrespective of social position or religious affliation.

"Let the great people of the great land of Washington postpone judgment until they have a chance to know the full truth about the present war in Malabar."" 
B. R. Ambedkar, who advocated for the formation of Pakistan in his book Pakistan or the Partition of India (1945), wrote on the rebellion:

Annie Besant, who wanted dominion status for India, opposed the non-cooperation movement, supported the Montague-Chelmsford reforms, who had adverse effect on her popularity due to difference of opinion and later left the political field, recounts in two separate articles in New India on 29 November 1921 and 6 December 1921 as to what happened to the Malabar Hindus at the hands of the Moplahs:

Annie Besant, who once led a walk out in the fifth District Conference held at Manjeri, Ernad taluk after the Montagu–Chelmsford Reforms was opposed in overwhelming support in a resolution in the conference, said on the rebellion:

Here is the text of Resolution No. 3 of the Ahmedabad session of the INC, where Gandhiji was appointed as its sole executive authority, on 24 December 1921, in connection with the Moplah Riots:

Here the rebuttal of D.V. Gundappa to INC's statement:

Swami Shraddhanand in the Liberator of 26 August 1926:

The Viceroy, Lord Reading:

The Rani of Nilambur in a petition to Lady Reading:

A conference held at Calicut presided over by the Zamorin of Calicut, the Ruler of Malabar issued a resolution:

K. P. Kesava Menon, who was the grandson of the Maharaja of Palakkad, and had been a part of the Khilafat movement said:

The English translation of the letter written to the newspaper The Hindu by Variyankunnath Kunjahammad Haji, as appeared in the newspaper on 18 October 1921:

Rashtriya Swayamsevak Sangh was formed by K. B. Hedgewar in the aftermath of the Hindu-Muslim riots during Khilafat Movement and particularly due to those during Moplah Riots.

Wagon Tragedy

On 10 November 1921 when the uprising was near its end, almost 100 detained Muslim prisoners were sent by train from Tirur to the Central Prison, Bellary in the Madras Presidency. 64 of the 100 prisoners suffocated to death in the closed railroad wagon. Few Hindus also include in the 70 people killed due to the Wagon Tragedy.

Statistics

According to official records, the colonial government lost 43 troops with 126 wounded, while 2337 rebels were killed, another 1652 injured and 45,404 imprisoned. Unofficial estimates put the number at  10,000 civilian deaths, 50,000 imprisoned, of who 20,000 were deported (mainly to the penal colony in the Andaman Islands) while around 1,000 went missing. The number of civilian casualties is estimated at between 10,000 and 12,000.

Lord Curzon's statement given in the British parliament was that, "The Moplah rebellion is just over, but at least 2,500 Moplahs have been killed by our troops, at least 1,000 Hindus were murdered, and at least 1,000 more were forcibly converted to Mahommedanism. Temples and churches were defiled and damaged, and property to the value of £250,000 was destroyed."

Within five years subsequent to the conflict the agricultural output was averaging slightly more than prior to it. Qureshi has said that, "In short, contrary to popular belief, Malabar did not suffer massive devastation, and even if it did the recovery was miraculous."

Popular culture
Renowned author Uroob's masterpiece novel Sundarikalum Sundaranmarum (The Beautiful and the Handsome) is set in the backdrops of Malabar Rebellion. The novel has about thirty characters belonging to three generations of eight families belonging to Malabar during the end of the Second World War. Sundarikalum Sundaranmarum won the Kendra Sahitya Akademi Award, India's most prestigious literary award, in 1960. It also received the Asan Centenary Award in 1973, a special award given by the Kerala Sahitya Akademi for the most outstanding work since Independence.

The 1988 Malayalam film 1921, directed by I. V. Sasi and written by T. Damodaran, depicts the events of the rebellion. The film stars Mammootty as Khadir, a retired Mappila soldier, alongside Madhu as Ali Musliyar. The film won the Kerala State Film Award for Best Film with Popular Appeal and Aesthetic Value in the same year. The 2023 film 1921: Puzha Muthal Puzha Vare was based on the riots and Variyankunnath Kunjahammad Haji, written and directed by Ramasimhan. Thalaivasal Vijay portrayed Haji.

The rebellion also spawned a large number of Mappila Songs. Many of these describe the events surrounding the Khilafat movement in Malabar and offer a view of conditions in the area at the time. Ahmed Kutty composed the Malabar Lahala Enna Khilafat Patt in 1925, which describes the events of the rebellion. Many of rebel prisoners such as Tannirkode Ossankoya composed songs in their letters to relatives.

Monuments

The officers and men from the Dorset Regiment who died while taking part in the suppression of the revolt are commemorated in a brass tablet at the St. Mark's Cathedral, Bangalore.

The Variyankunnath Kunjahammad Haji Memorial Town Hall in Malappuram Municipality is named after the leader of the rebellion, while the Tirur Wagon Tragedy  Memorial Town Hall commemorates the eponymous incident. The Pookkottur War Memorial Gate is dedicated to those killed in the Pookkottur battle.

Along with these monuments, abandoned graves of British officers who died during the rebellion can be seen in Malabar. This includes that of Private F. M. Eley, Private H. C. Hutchings (both died of wounds received in action against the Mappilas at Tirurangadi on 22 July 1921), William John Duncan Rowley (Assistant Suprededent of Police, Palghat, killed at Tirurangadi by a mob of Mappilas at the outbreak of the rebellion on 20 August 1921 – aged 28).

See also
 Murder of Collector Connolly
 Khilafat Movement
 Malabar Special Police
 Freeman Freeman-Thomas, 1st Marquess of Willingdon
 John Burnett-Stuart
 Dorset Regiment

References

Bibliography
 
 
 
 
 

Conflicts in 1921
Indian independence movement
Indian independence movement in Kerala
Rebellions in India
British India
Mappilas
Massacres in India
Anti-Hindu sentiment
Religiously motivated violence in India
1921 in India
Islam in Kerala
Riots and civil disorder in India
Anti-Hindu violence in British India